St Talogan Parish Church is a ruined church in Fordyce, Aberdeenshire, Scotland, of which only the chancel and western tower remain. Now a scheduled monument, having formerly been Category A listed, a structure on the site has existed since at least the 13th century.

The remaining structure is divided into two burial enclosures, one of Ogilvy of Findlater and one of James Ogilvy of Deskford (d. 1509).

The bellcote is dated 1661.

The congregation moved to a new church, Fordyce Parish Church, built in 1804.

References

External links

Churches in Aberdeenshire
16th-century establishments in Scotland
16th-century churches
Scheduled Ancient Monuments in Aberdeenshire
Listed churches in Scotland
Church ruins in Scotland